KKM may refer to:

 Knaster–Kuratowski–Mazurkiewicz lemma, in mathematics
 Kyo Kara Maoh!, a series of Japanese light novels
 Kola Kolaya Mundhirika, a 2010 Tamil comedy film
 KKM, a song by the music group Miracle Legion from their 1996 album Portrait of a Damaged Family